Bon Jir (also Romanized as Bon Jīr) is a village in Sofla Rural District, in the Central District of Kharameh County, Fars Province, Iran. At the 2006 census, its population was 1,030, in 263 families.

References 

Populated places in Kharameh County